Samuel Orkin Freedman,  (born May 8, 1928) is a Canadian clinical immunologist, professor and academic administrator. In 1965, he co-discovered with Phil Gold the carcinoembryonic antigen, the basis of a blood test used in the diagnosis and management of people with colorectal cancer.

Background 
Born in Montreal, Freedman received a Bachelor of Science in 1948 and a Doctor of Medicine in 1953 from McGill University.

Career 
From 1977 to 1981, he was the Dean of the McGill University Faculty of Medicine. From 1981 to 1991, he served as McGill's chief academic officer with the title of Vice-Principal, Academic (equivalent to Provost at U.S. universities). Freedman received an honorary degree from McGill in 1992. He was named Professor Emeritus in 2000. Until January 1, 2008,  Freedman was senior advisor to the Sir Mortimer B. Davis Jewish General Hospital in Montreal, where he was previously research director.

Book
 Clinical Immunology (2nd edition) 1976 by Samuel O. Freedman and Phil Gold.

Honours
 In 1976, he was made a Fellow of the Royal Society of Canada.
 In 1978, he was awarded the Gairdner Foundation International Award.
 In 1985, he was made an Officer of the Order of Canada.
 In 1998, he was awarded the Quebec government's Prix Armand-Frappier.
 In 2004, he was made a Knight of the National Order of Quebec.

References

External links
  Gold P, Freedman SO. Demonstration of tumor-specific antigens in human colonic carcinomata by immunological tolerance and absorption techniques. J Exp Med 1965;121:439.
 Prix Armand-Frappier Citation (in French)
  Order of Canada Citation

1928 births
Living people
Jewish Canadian writers
Canadian immunologists
Canadian medical researchers
Canadian university and college faculty deans
Canadian university and college vice-presidents
Fellows of the Royal Society of Canada
Knights of the National Order of Quebec
Officers of the Order of Canada
McGill University Faculty of Medicine alumni
Academic staff of McGill University
Writers from Montreal
Anglophone Quebec people